This is a list of lists of lakes.

List of lakes
List of alpine lakes
List of drying lakes
List of international lakes
List of prehistoric lakes
List of lakes by area
List of lakes by depth
List of lakes by volume
List of largest lakes of Europe
List of lakes named Diamond
List of lakes named Fish Lake
List of largest lakes and seas in the Solar System
Recursive islands and lakes

Lists by country

 List of lakes of Afghanistan
 List of lakes of Albania
 List of lakes of Algeria
 List of lakes of Andorra
 List of lakes of Angola
 List of lakes of Antigua and Barbuda
 List of lakes of Argentina
 List of lakes of Armenia
 List of lakes of Australia
 Lakes and other water bodies of Victoria (Australia)
 Lakes and reservoirs of Melbourne
 Lists of lakes of Western Australia
 List of lakes of Austria
 List of lakes of Azerbaijan
 List of lakes of the Bahamas
 List of lakes of Bahrain
 List of lakes of Bangladesh
 List of lakes of Barbados
 List of lakes of Belarus
 List of lakes of Bavaria
 List of lakes of Belgium
 List of lakes of Belize
 List of lakes of Benin
 List of lakes of Bhutan
 List of lakes of Bolivia
 List of lakes of Bosnia and Herzegovina
 List of lakes of Botswana
 List of lakes of Brazil
 List of lakes of Brunei
 List of lakes of Bulgaria
 List of lakes of Burkina Faso
 List of lakes of Burundi
 List of lakes of Cambodia
 List of lakes of Cameroon
 List of lakes of Canada
 List of lakes of Alberta
 List of lakes of British Columbia
 List of lakes of Manitoba
 List of lakes of New Brunswick
 List of lakes of Newfoundland and Labrador
 List of lakes of the Northwest Territories
 List of lakes of Nova Scotia
 List of lakes of Nunavut
 List of lakes of Ontario
 List of lakes of Quebec
 List of lakes of Saskatchewan
 List of lakes of Yoho National Park
 List of lakes of Yukon
 List of lakes of Cape Verde
 List of lakes of Chad
 List of lakes of Chile
 List of lakes of China
 List of lakes of Colombia
 List of lakes of Comoros
 List of lakes of the Republic of the Congo
 List of lakes of Democratic Republic of the Congo
 List of lakes of the Cook Islands
 List of lakes of Costa Rica
 List of lakes of Croatia
 List of lakes of Cuba
 List of lakes of Cyprus
 List of lakes of the Czech Republic
 List of lakes of Denmark
 List of lakes of Djibouti
 List of lakes of Dominica
 List of lakes of the Dominican Republic
 List of lakes of East Timor
 List of lakes of Ecuador
 List of lakes of Egypt
 List of lakes of El Salvador
 List of lakes of Equatorial Guinea
 List of lakes of Eritrea
 List of lakes of Estonia
 List of lakes of Ethiopia
 List of lakes of the Faroe Islands
 List of lakes of Fiji
 List of lakes of Finland
 List of lakes of France
 List of lakes of Gabon
 List of lakes of Gambia
 List of lakes of Georgia (country)
 List of lakes of Germany
 List of lakes of Ghana
 List of lakes of Greece
 List of lakes of Grenada
 List of lakes of Guatemala
 List of lakes of Guinea
 List of lakes of Guyana
 List of lakes of Haiti
 List of lakes of Honduras
 List of lakes of Hungary
 List of lakes of Himachal Pradesh
 List of lakes of Hong Kong
 List of lakes of Iceland
 List of lakes of India
 List of lakes of Indonesia
 List of loughs of Ireland
 List of lakes of Israel
 List of lakes of Italy
 List of lakes of Ivory Coast
 List of lakes of Jamaica
 List of lakes of Japan
 List of lakes of Jordan
 List of lakes of Kazakhstan
 List of lakes of Kenya
 List of lakes of Kiribati
 List of lakes of Korea
 List of lakes of Kosovo
 List of lakes of Kuwait
 List of lakes of Kyrgyzstan
 List of lakes of Laos
 List of lakes of Latvia
 List of lakes of Lebanon
 List of lakes of Lesotho
 List of lakes of Liberia
 List of lakes of Libya
 List of lakes of Liechtenstein
 List of lakes of Lithuania
 List of lakes of Luxembourg
 List of lakes of Malaysia
 List of lakes of Mexico
 List of lakes of Mongolia
 List of lakes of Montenegro
 List of lakes of the Netherlands
 List of lakes of New Zealand
 List of lakes of Norway
 List of lakes of Aust-Agder
 List of lakes of Pakistan
 List of lakes of Papua New Guinea
 List of lakes of Poland
 List of lakes of Romania
 List of lakes of Bucharest
 List of lakes of Russia
 List of lakes of Rwanda
 List of lakes of Serbia
 List of lakes of Singapore
 List of lakes of Slovenia
 List of lakes of South Africa
 List of lakes of Sweden
 List of lakes of Switzerland
 List of dams and reservoirs in Switzerland
List of mountain lakes of Switzerland
 List of lakes of Taiwan
 List of lakes of Tamil Nadu
 List of lakes of Tanzania
 List of lakes of Turkey
 List of lakes of Turkmenistan
 List of lakes of Uganda
 List of lakes of Uzbekistan
 List of lakes of Vietnam
 List of lakes of Zambia
 List of lakes and lochs of the United Kingdom
 List of lakes of the Lake District
 List of lakes of England
 List of lochs of Scotland
 List of lakes of Wales
 List of loughs of Ireland
 List of lakes of the United States
 List of lakes of the United States by area
 List of lakes of the St. Johns River
 List of lakes of Alabama
 List of lakes of Alaska
 List of lakes of Arizona
 List of lakes of Arkansas
 List of lakes of California
 List of lakes of the San Francisco Bay Area
 List of lakes of Lake County, California
 List of lakes of Colorado
 List of lakes of Connecticut
 List of lakes of Delaware
 List of lakes of Florida
 List of lakes of Georgia (U.S. state)
 List of lakes of Hawaii
 List of lakes of Idaho
 List of lakes of Illinois
 List of lakes of Indiana
 List of lakes of Iowa
 List of lakes, reservoirs, and dams in Kansas
 List of lakes of Kentucky
 List of lakes of Louisiana
 List of lakes of Maine
 List of lakes of Maryland
 List of lakes of Massachusetts
 List of lakes of Michigan
 List of lakes of Minnesota
 List of lakes of Mississippi
 List of lakes of Missouri
 List of lakes of Montana
 List of lakes of Nebraska
 List of lakes of Nevada
 List of lakes of New Hampshire
 List of lakes of New Jersey
 List of lakes of New Mexico
 List of lakes of New York
 List of lakes of North Carolina
 List of lakes of North Dakota
 List of lakes of Ohio
 List of lakes of Oklahoma
 List of lakes of Oregon
 List of lakes of Pennsylvania
 List of lakes of Puerto Rico
 List of lakes of Rhode Island
 List of lakes of South Carolina
 List of lakes of South Dakota
 List of lakes of Tennessee
 List of lakes of Texas
 List of lakes of Utah
 List of lakes of Vermont
 List of lakes of Virginia
 List of lakes of Washington
 List of lakes of West Virginia
 List of lakes of Wisconsin
 List of lakes of Wyoming

See also

 
Lists of bodies of water